The Diocesan Shrine of Nuestra Señora del Buen Suceso - Saint Andrew Cathedral-Parish, also known as Parañaque Cathedral or Saint Andrew Cathedral, is one of the oldest churches in the Philippines, located in Parañaque City, National Capital Region.

History

Spanish Period
Saint Andrew Parish started when Augustinian missionaries set foot on a fishing village near the sea, some kilometers south of Manila, more than four hundred years ago. The missionaries' purpose was to evangelize the natives in order to facilitate the conquest of the islands for Spain. The town was called "Palanyag", the contraction for the word "Paglalayag" which means sailing. At that time, Palanyag consisted of several nipa huts grouped as a residential settlement known as "barangays." Fray Elviro Jorde Perez,  being the Augustinian historian in the 19th century, wrote that as early as 1575, the Provincial Chapter subjected the populace of Palanyag to the patronage of St. Andrew, and later on to the advocacy of the Nuestra Señora del Buen Suceso, an image of the blessed virgin Mary enthroned on August 10, 1625.

The pioneer missionary in Parañaque was Fray Juan de Orto,  Although based in Manila, he started to administer to the spiritual needs of the village folks in 1575. In 1580 Fray Diego de Espinal,  was appointed superior in the convent of Parañaque. He established a mission house, with its spiritual jurisdiction reaching up to Cavite El Viejo. He was assisted by Fray Francisco Campos, . The Conference of Chiefs of the Religious Order, held on May 11, 1580, accepted Palanyag as an independent town, and it is in this date which the foundation day of the parish of Saint Andrew the Apostle was officially known, under the patronage of Saint Andrew, patron of fishermen.

Since there was no income for parish maintenance at that time, royal support, as ordered by King Felipe II, was given to each religious order who worked on the conversion of the natives. Parañaque, in 1589, was given a periodic sustenance which consisted of 200 pesos and 200 bushels of rice for the two religious assigned at St. Andrew. Later on, financial assistance was given to buy wine and oil to keep the Blessed Sacrament lighted.

During the 16th and 17th century, the Parish of St. Andrew was made up of only a few homes, found mostly along the Parañaque River and Manila Bay in the present barrios of Don Galo, La Huerta and San Dionisio. Later, Tambo, Santo Niño and Baclaran developed. Barrios Don Galo, La Huerta and San Dionisio built bisitas, or satellite chapels with facades built facing the St. Andrew Church. The San Nicolas de Tolentino Chapel, the one located at Barrio La Huerta, still has the inscription 1776, the year the said chapel was erected.

In 1662, when the Chinese pirate Koxinga threatened to invade Manila, Governor General Sabiniano Manrique de Lara ordered the demolition of all stone churches and convents located outside Intramuros, Manila. The stones were used to beef up the defenses of Manila as well as to prevent its use by the enemy as defenses. More than a dozen churches and convents, which included the only one in Parañaque were torn down. The original convent of St. Andrew was demolished.

Fray Eusebio Polo,  was the parish priest of St. Andrew in 1759, during the British invasion of Manila. He was then succeeded by Fray Manuel de Sto. Tomas Garcia,  in 1762. Both priests were deported to Goa, India, with 12 other fellow Augustinians.

Congregation of the Immaculate Heart of Mary

After more than three hundred years of the Augustinians, the missionaries from the Congregation of the Immaculate Heart of Mary came to administer the parish. A lot of changes came, including the foundation of the parish's school, St. Andrew's School, the creation of the church's social arm, Parañaque Development Foundation, Inc., the several replacements of the church's altar and the creation of a dome on which the crucifix that signifies the Lord Jesus Christ is placed.

Secularization

Upon secularization on January 1, 1994 (led by Rev. Fr. Romerico Prieto of the Archdiocese of Manila), the altar was once again replaced and enthroned the image of the Nuestra Señora del Buen Suceso in the center tabernacle. Because of the desire to make the altar more attractive, it was again replaced in 1997 by Very Rev. Msgr. Bayani Valenzuela with a classic baroque style. In this said altar, the image of the parish's patron, St. Andrew the Apostle is found on the right hand side of the altar, while the image of St. Joseph is found on the left. In the center of the altar is where the image of Our Lady of Buen Suceso is found.

On January 25, 2005, Most Rev. Jesse Mercado, Bishop of Parañaque launched after the 10 A.M. English Holy Mass the renovation of the cathedral. Rev. Msgr. Manuel G. Gabriel, then parish priest and rector of the cathedral parish, through a special project committee and the pastoral council, spearheaded the massive renovation of the cathedral and gathering of funds to sustain the project. The renovation has changed the Major altar placing the Crucifix on its center, adding two side chapels (altar of saints and Nuestra Señora del Buen Suceso Chapel), replacing the glass windows with stained glass featuring some of the important events in the Life of our Lord Jesus, placing new marble stone on the floor and replacing the roof and ceiling of the cathedral painting the interior walls, replacing the doors, placing an air conditioning units and the restoration of the original image of Nuestra Señora del Buen Suceso and St. Andrew the Apostle. In May 2010, during the 430th year of the church foundation, the newly renovated church was blessed by Bishop Jesse Mercado.

Cathedral

Before Manila Archbishop Jaime L. Cardinal Sin,  retired, he erected new dioceses due to the increasing number of the Catholic population. One of the newly formed dioceses was the Diocese of Parañaque. Manila Auxiliary Bishop Jesse E. Mercado, then serving as the District Bishop of the Ecclesiastical District of Parañaque (former known as the District of Pasay/PPLM), was appointed as its first bishop on January 28, 2003.

The church provided a new organ that the choirs use during masses. Also, a cathedra was placed, as a seat for the bishop. The baptismal font was placed in the right hand side of the altar and there were twelve marble stones with crucifixes which symbolizes the twelve apostles of Jesus Christ. There was also the setting up of the PowerPoint visuals to guide the parishioners in celebration of the holy masses.

Parish Priests

Below is the list of the past and present parish priests of the church that paved the way of Christianity within the locality of Palanyag (modern day Parañaque) and to the southernmost parts of Metro Manila.
<poem>
1. (1580 - 1582) Rev. Fr. Diego de Espinal, O.S.A.
2. (1582 - 1584) Rev. Fr. Lorenzo de Leon, O.S.A.
3. (1584 - 1590) Rev. Fr. Francisco del Camo, O.S.A.
4. (1590 - 1594) Rev. Fr. Francisco de Canga Rodriguez, O.S.A.
5. (1594 - 1596) Rev. Fr. Alonso de Vargas, O.S.A. (First Term)
6. (1596 - 1602) Rev. Fr. Juan de Valderrama, O.S.A. (First Term)
7. (1602 - 1603) Rev. Fr. Juan Gutierrez, O.S.A.
8. (1603)        Rev. Fr. Juan Tapia, O.S.A.
9. (1603 - 1605) Rev. Fr. Diego Guevarra, O.S.A.
10. (1605)       Rev. Fr. Alonso de Vargas, O.S.A. (Second Term)
11. (1605 - 1608) Rev. Fr. Gabriel Rojas, O.S.A.
12. (1608)        Rev. Fr. Juan de Valderrama, O.S.A. (Second Term)
13. (1608 - 1611) Rev. Fr. Jeronimo de Oviedo, O.S.A.
14. (1611 - 1612) Rev. Fr. Francisco de Castramonte, O.S.A.
15. (1612 - 1614) Rev. Fr. Dionisio Navarro, O.S.A.
16. (1614 - 1617) Rev. Fr. Hernando Cabrera, O.S.A.
17. (1617 - 1620) Rev. Fr. Gaspar de Onis, O.S.A.
18. (1620 - 1623) Rev. Fr. Lorenzo Figueroa, O.S.A.
19. (1623 - 1624) Rev. Fr. Lucas Atienza, O.S.A.
20. (1624 - 1625) Rev. Fr. Pedro Castillo, O.S.A.
21. (1625 - 1626) Rev. Fr. Juan de Guevarra, O.S.A.
22. (1626 - 1629) Rev. Fr. Juan de Montemayor, O.S.A.
23. (1629 - 1632) Rev. Fr. Geronimo Medrano, O.S.A.
24. (1632 - 1633) Rev. Fr. Diego Robles, O.S.A.
25. (1633 - 1637) Rev. Fr. Sebastian del Rio, O.S.A.
26. (1637 - 1638) Rev. Fr. Esteban Manrique, O.S.A.
27. (1638 - 1650) Rev. Fr. Dionisio Suarez, O.S.A.
28. (1650 - 1653) Rev. Fr. Antonio Mojica, O.S.A.
29. (1653 - 1656) Rev. Fr. Baltasar Herrera,  O.S.A.
30. (1656 - 1657) Rev. Fr. Jose de Mendoza,  O.S.A.
31. (1657 - 1659) Rev. Fr. Luis Herrera, O.S.A.
32. (1659 - 1662) Rev. Fr. Alfonso Clemente, O.S.A.
33. (1662 - 1665) Rev. Fr. Francisco Martinez, O.S.A.
34. (1665 - 1672) Rev. Fr. Carlos Bautista, O.S.A. (First Term)
35. (1672 - 1674) Rev. Fr. Miguel Rubio,  O.S.A.
36. (1674 - 1680) Rev. Fr. Carlos Bautista, O.S.A. (Second Term)
37. (1680 - 1684) Rev. Fr. Alonso Anillas, O.S.A.
38. (1684 - 1686) Rev. Fr. Felipe Castro,  O.S.A. (First Term)
39. (1686 - 1689) Rev. Fr. Jose Ricaforte, O.S.A.
40. (1689 - 1690) Rev. Fr. Francisco Castrillon, O.S.A.
41. (1690 - 1691) Rev. Fr. Ignacio Mercado, O.S.A.
42. (1691 - 1693) Rev. Fr. Felipe Castro, O.S.A. (Second Term)
43. (1693 - 1695) Rev. Fr. Gaspar de San Agustin, O.S.A. (First Term)
44. (1695 - 1699) Rev. Fr. Simeon Martinez, O.S.A.
45. (1699 - 1704) Rev. Fr. Nicolas de San Pedro del Castillo, O.S.A.
46. (1704 - 1707) Rev. Fr. Gaspar Garcia Sossa, O.S.A. (First Term)
47. (1707 - 1710) Rev. Fr. Gabriel de la Fuente, O.S.A. (First Term)
48. (1710 - 1711) Rev. Fr. Gaspar Garcia Sossa, O.S.A. (Second Term)
49. (1711 - 1713) Rev. Fr. Gaspar de San Agustin, O.S.A. (Second Term)
50. (1713 - 1716) Rev. Fr. Juan Antonio Navarette, O.S.A.
51. (1716 - 1719) Rev. Fr. Gabriel de la Fuente, O.S.A. (Second Term)
52. (1719 - 1722) Rev. Fr. Gaspar de San Agustin, O.S.A. (Second Term)
53. (1722)        Rev. Fr. Alonso Inojedo, O.S.A.
54. (1722 - 1725) Rev. Fr. Matias Mercado, O.S.A.
55. (1725 - 1726) Rev. Fr. Jose Pasamonte, O.S.A.
56. (1726 - 1730) Rev. Fr. Jose Nebot, O.S.A.
57. (1730 - 1734) Rev. Fr. Jose del Ario, O.S.A.
58. (1734 - 1735) Rev. Fr. Bernardo de la Iglesia, O.S.A.
59. (1735 - 1740) Rev. Fr. Nicolas Rodriguez, O.S.A.
60. (1740 - 1744) Rev. Fr. Manuel Barcina, O.S.A.
61. (1744 - 1746) Rev. Fr. Juan Facundo Meseguer, O.S.A. (First Term)
62. (1746 - 1747) Rev. Fr. Jose Victoria, O.S.A.
63. (1747 - 1749) Rev. Fr. Jose Viar, O.S.A.
64. (1749)        Rev. Fr. Cristoval Ximenes, O.S.A.
65. (1749 - 1750) Rev. Fr. Jose de Ordones, O.S.A.
66. (1750)        Rev. Fr. Pedro Turado, O.S.A.
67. (1750 - 1751) Rev. Fr. Domindo Beovide,  O.S.A.
68. (1751 - 1753) Rev. Fr. Juan Albarran, O.S.A.
69. (1753 - 1755) Rev. Fr. Remigio Hernandez, O.S.A.
70. (1755 - 1756) Rev. Fr. Manuel Vidal, O.S.A.
71. (1756 - 1759) Rev. Fr. Pablo de Campos, O.S.A.
72. (1759)        Rev. Fr. Juan Facundo Meseguer, O.S.A. (Second Term)
73. (1759 - 1762) Rev. Fr. Gregorio Gener, O.S.A.
74. (1762)        Rev. Fr. Eusebio Polo, O.S.A.
75. (1762 - 1765) Rev. Fr. Manuel de Santo Tomas Garcia, O.S.A.
76. (1765)        Rev. Fr. Jose de Leon, O.S.A.
77. (1765 - 1766) Rev. Fr. Juan de Ignacio de Loyola, O.S.A.
78. (1766 - 1767) Rev. Fr. Julian de Santa Ana, O.S.A.
79. (1767)        Rev. Fr. Juan Solares, O.S.A.
80. (1767)        Rev. Fr. Bartolme Solana, O.S.A.
81. (1767 - 1769) Rev. Fr. Francisco Bencuchillo, O.S.A.
82. (1769 - 1770) Rev. Fr. Pedro Hornillo, O.S.A.
83. (1770)        Rev. Fr. Bernardo Notario, O.S.A.
84. (1770 - 1773) Rev. Fr. Domindo Gorasarii, O.S.A.
85. (1773 - 1775) Rev. Fr. Pedro de San Agustin Perez, O.S.A.
86. (1775 - 1778) Rev. Fr. Narciso de Ayala (Archdiocese of Manila)
87. (1778 - 1779) Rev. Fr. Juan Izaga, O.S.A.
88. (1779 - 1783) Rev. Fr. Manuel Recio, O.S.A.
89. (1783 - 1786) Rev. Fr. Tomas Garcia, O.S.A.
90. (1786 - 1787) Rev. Fr. Andres Patino, O.S.A.
91. (1787 - 1791) Rev. Fr. Juan de la Madrid, O.S.A. (First Term)
92. (1791 - 1792) Rev. Fr. Celedonio Hernandez (Archdiocese of Manila)
93. (1792 - 1796) Rev. Fr. Juan de la Madrid, O.S.A. (Second Term)
94. (1796 - 1797) Rev. Fr. Gregorio Gallego, O.S.A.
95. (1797 - 1806) Rev. Fr. Joaquin Martinez de Zuñiga, O.S.A. (First 
Term - Created "Gozo sa Mahal na Birhen ng Buen Suceso (Our Lady of Good Events)")
96. (1806 - 1808) Rev. Fr. Andres Carpintero, O.S.A.
97. (1808)        Rev. Fr. Gervacio Estar, O.S.A.
98. (1808 - 1810) Rev. Fr. Pedro Juan Pometa, O.S.A.
99. (1810 - 1818) Rev. Fr. Joaquin Martinez de Zuñiga, O.S.A. (Second 
Term)
100. (1818)        Rev. Fr. Raymundo Martinez, O.S.A. (First Term)
101. (1818 - 1821) Rev. Fr. Juan Rico, O.S.A.
102. (1821 - 1824) Rev. Fr. Andres Vehil, O.S.A.
103. (1824 - 1825) Rev. Fr. Raymundo Martinez, O.S.A. (Second Term)
104. (1825 - 1827) Rev. Fr. Jose Maria de Torres, O.S.A.
105. (1827)        Rev. Fr. Hilario del Rosario, O.S.A.
106. (1827 - 1829) Rev. Fr. Manuel Miranda, O.S.A.
107. (1829 - 1831) Rev. Fr. Manuel Jaraba, O.S.A.
108. (1831 - 1836) Rev. Fr. Francisco Miro, O.S.A.
109. (1836 - 1838) Rev. Fr. Agustin de San Clemente, O.S.A.
110. (1838 - 1839) Rev. Fr. Manuel Blanco, O.S.A.
111. (1839 - 1846) Rev. Fr. Antonio Llanos, O.S.A.
112. (1846 - 1849) Rev. Fr. Bonifacio Albarran, O.S.A.
113. (1849 - 1857) Rev. Fr. Gregorio Prieto, O.S.A.
114. (1857 - 1859) Rev. Fr. Matias Noboa, O.S.A.
115. (1859 - 1878) Rev. Fr. Santiago Diaz, O.S.A.
116. (1878 - 1880) Rev. Fr. Francisco Royo, O.S.A.
117. (1880 - 1881) Rev. Fr. Jose Diaz, O.S.A.
118. (1881 - 1897) Rev. Fr. Emilio Nulle, O.S.A.
119. (1897 - 1898) Rev. Fr. Victor Perez, O.S.A.
120. (1898)        Rev. Fr. Guillermo Diaz, O.S.A.
121. (1898 - 1901) Rev. Fr. Manuel Ocol (Archdiocese of Manila)
122. (1901 - 1902) Rev. Fr. Perfecto Lipoco (Archdiocese of Manila)
123. (1902 - 1915) Rev. Fr. Miguel Tomas (Archdiocese of Manila)
124. (1915)        Rev. Fr. Corneliode Brouwer, C.I.C.M.
125. (1915 - 1924) Rev. Fr. Joseph Van Runckelen, C.I.C.M. (First Term)
126. (1924 - 1926) Rev. Fr. Victor de Klerck, C.I.C.M.
127. (1926 - 1934) Rev. Fr. Joseph Van Runckelen, C.I.C.M. (Second Term)
128. (1934 - 1937) Rev. Fr. Antonio Van Overveld, C.I.C.M.
129. (1937 - 1952) Rev. Fr. Adolfo Cansse, C.I.C.M.
130. (1952 - 1977) Rev. Fr. Louis Thys, C.I.C.M.
131. (1977 - 1991) Rev. Fr. Paul Foulon, C.I.C.M.
132. (1991 - 1993) Rev. Fr. Francis Gevaert, C.I.C.M.
133. (1994 - 1995) Rev. Fr. Romerico Prieto (Archdiocese of Manila) - presently in the Diocese of Cubao
134. (1995 - 1996) Rev. Msgr. Manuel Sebastian, P.C. (Archdiocese of Manila) - presently a deceased priest of the Diocese of Parañaque
135. (1996 - 2004) Rev. Msgr. Bayani Valenzuela, P.C., S.T.L. (Archdiocese of Manila/Diocese of Parañaque, resigned) - presently serving as on-loan priest in the Archdiocese of New York
136. (2004 - 2011) Rev. Msgr. Manuel G. Gabriel, P.C., S.Th.D. (Diocese of Parañaque, retired)
137. (2011 - 2017) Rev. Fr. Rolando R. Agustin (Diocese of Parañaque)
138. (2017 - 2020) Rev. Msgr. Allen C. Aganon, P.C., V.G. (Diocese of Parañaque)
139. (2020 - Present) Rev. Fr. Augusto C. Pulido (Diocese of Parañaque)'</poem>

Tripartite Council and Commissions
In order to achieve the parish's vision, the Tripartite Council was formed - the first the Parish Formation Council, headed by ------, the next is the Parish Pastoral Council, headed by Mr. Conrado Espiritu III, and the third Council is the Parish Finance Council, headed by Mr. Rolando B. De Leon.

Annual events

Feasts
Every year, the parish community of St. Andrew's celebrate two main feasts. First of them is the feast of Nuestra Señora del Buen Suceso. There was a plenty of misinformation about the Feast of Our Lady of Buen Suceso. After the World War II up to year 2004, the feast is celebrated every 29th day of November, therefore, there is no original feast and it depends upon the situation and needs of the faithful. The feast day of Nuestra Señora del Buen Suceso was then moved to August 10 in the year 2005, in line with her enthronement in this said parish by the Augustinians back in the year 1625. A novena prayer in honor of the Blessed Virgin is prayed for nine days before the actual feast day. Traslacion happens during the first day of novena from Sta. Monica chapel to Cathedral. But during the term of Rev. Fr. Rolando Agustin, the Traslacion was stopped because according to Fr. Agustin it's unliturgical. During the feast day itself, a procession is held at around 4 p.m. and a Solemn Mass follows. The same is also done during the feast day of the parish's patron, St. Andrew the Apostle.
Feast dates approved by the Diocese of Parañaque:
January 25 - Being a cathedral and seat of the bishop of the Diocese of Parañaque (2003)
May 11 - Being a parish church of Parañaque City (1580)
August 1–9 - Novena Masses in honour to Nuestra Señora del Buen Suceso
August 10 - Feast day and Enthronement of Nuestra Señora del Buen Suceso (1625)
August 10 - Being a Diocesan Shrine of Nuestra Señora del Buen Suceso (2012)
September 8 - Canonical coronation of Nuestra Señora del Buen Suceso (2000)
November 21–29 - Novena Masses in honour of St. Andrew the Apostle
November 30 - Feast day of St. Andrew the Apostle

Canonical Coronation of Nuestra Señora del Buen Suceso

September 8, 2000 was the date when the image of Nuestra Señora del Buen Suceso was canonically crowned as the Patroness of the City of Parañaque. Last September 8, 2010, the official replica made by Tom Joven was blessed including the book of sacrifice, the petition box and the thanksgiving box by Msgr. Manuel Gabriel during the Solemn High Mass. The Diocese of Parañaque approved a decree signed by the chancellor and the Bishop of Parañaque that the Cofradia de Nuestra Señora del Buen Suceso was tasked to promote, propagate and preserve the devotion and shall be the custodian of the original image. The Recamaderas de la Virgen who are exclusively women whose members come from each sub-parishes (Sta. Monica, San Nicolas de Tolentino, San Dionisio and San Antonio de Padua), are primarily responsible for vesting the image together with the Commission on Patrimony that conducts the periodic inspection of the structural integrity and supervise the vesting of the image and its jewelries. They also instructed Mr. Matt Ryan de Leon to be the Camarero or Steward of our Lady of the Good Event. A manual "The Care of the Image of Nuestra Señora del Buen Suceso: Policies and Procedures" was made kept by the cathedral office for the primary care of the original image of the Virgin Mary.

Renovation
On January 25, 2009, Rev. Msgr. Manuel G. Gabriel, the parish priest and rector of the cathedral parish launched the major renovation of the cathedral with the blessing of Most Rev. Jesse E. Mercado, DD. The renovation has changed the Major altar placing the Crucifix on its center, adding two side altars (Altar of Saints and Altar of Nuestra Señora del Buen Suceso), replaced the glass windows with stained glass featuring some of the important events in the Life of our Lord Jesus, placed new marble stone on the floor and replaced the roof and ceiling of the cathedral painting the interior walls, replaced the doors, placed air conditioning units and has restored the image of Nuestra Señora del Buen Suceso and St. Andrew the Apostle.

The newly renovated Cathedral Parish of St. Andrew was blessed on May 22, 2010, in line with the celebration of the 430th Dedication of St. Andrew's Parish.

Dedication of being the Parish of St. Andrew
The cathedral and Parañaqueños celebrated the 430th anniversary of St. Andrew Parish as a parish on May 11, 2010, with its theme: "Dakilang Pagdiriwang ng ika-430 taon ng Ebanghelisasyon at Biyaya...Tayo na, Pumalaot at Mamalakaya..." (The Great 430th Year of Evangelization and Grace... Come, Let Us Sail and Trawl...). It was a one-week celebration starting May 11, 2010, until the blessing of the cathedral on May 22, 2010. The program included Parañaque traditions such as Grand Sunduan of all sub-parishes (San Dionisio, Sta. Monica, San Nicolas and San Antonio), Sayaw ng Pagbati Festival, Komedya ng San Dionisio, Food and Crafts Exhibit, Music Festival and the Parañaque/Palanyag Movie.

Declaration of being a Diocesan Shrine of Nuestra Señora del Buen Suceso
On August 10, 2012 (Feast day), with the DOP Decree No. 2012-005 the Cathedral-Parish of St. Andrew was Officially made into a Diocesan Shrine of the Nuestra Señora del Buen Suceso. After the Greeting during the Mass, Most Rev. Bishop Jesse Mercado D.D. through Rev. Fr. Carmelo Estores, read the declaration of the Cathedral-Parish of St. Andrew as the Diocesan Shrine of Nuestra Señora del Buen Suceso.

Notes

External links

 coordinates

Resources and bibliography

 The Solemn Canonical Coronation of the Nuestra Señora del Buen Suceso, September 8, 2000
 Palanyag to Parañaque by Dulce Festin-Baybay, a book published by the City of Parañaque
 Nobena sa Karangalan ng Nuestra Señora del Buen Suceso, October 7, 1996, p. 6
 Simbahan ng San Andres Noon at Ngayon (The Church of St. Andrew, Then and Now) by Dr. Lulet Tungpalan, Ms. Noemi Pabico and Mr. Raymond Calma, from the LAYAG, the official newsletter of the Cathedral Parish of St. Andrew, year-end edition 2004
 Nobena sa Karangalan ni San Andres Apostol'' (Novena) November, 2005
 Liturgical Schedules are based from the cathedral's 2007 calendar

Roman Catholic cathedrals in the Philippines
Buildings and structures in Parañaque
Roman Catholic churches in Metro Manila
Roman Catholic churches completed in 1580
1580 establishments in the Philippines
Cultural Properties of the Philippines in Metro Manila
Spanish Colonial architecture in the Philippines
Baroque church buildings in the Philippines
16th-century Roman Catholic church buildings in the Philippines